Prague 6, formally the municipal district Prague 6 (Městská část Praha 6), is the largest Prague district.

It is located in the north-west of Prague. It covers 41.54 km² and has 100,600 inhabitants (31.12.2008).

The administrative district (správní obvod) of the same name comprises Prague 6 and municipal districts Lysolaje, Nebušice, Přední Kopanina and Suchdol.

Prague 6 includes cadastral areas Ruzyně, Liboc, Veleslavín, Vokovice, Dejvice, Střešovice and parts of cadastral areas Břevnov, Sedlec, Bubeneč and Hradčany.

The district contains several sites (e.g. Břevnov Monastery) and cultural institutions (Semafor, Divadlo Spejbla a Hurvínka, the Baba district and the Hvězda Game Reserve with its many chateaux in an area of 86 hectares. Also the biggest airport in Czech Republic, the Václav Havel Airport is located in this District.

Ondřej Kolář from TOP09 is the Mayor of the municipal district Prague 6 since 2014.

Strahov 
Strahov is characterised by an aging sports stadium and constant construction works and is especially popular amongst students. Their “town” consists of ten large blocks of dormitories accommodating not only young people from all over the world but also several classic student pubs and restaurants and some of the best night clubs in town. Important sight: Strahov Monastery.

Břevnov 
Home of the medical students and the Kajetánka University Residence. However, it is also considered a “good address" in Prague. For this reason, the current Czech President resides here, as have all his predecessors. Also Jaroslav Seifert, the poet and Literature Nobel Laureate, lived in Břevnov. Important sight: Břevnov Monastery.

Dejvice 
Home to many technically oriented faculties of Charles University, such as those of Engineering, Civil Engineering and Chemistry. Popular residential area amongst "better” Prague families and foreigners, especially Americans.
Important sights: National Technical Library, Vítězné náměstí (Victory Square)- the central square of Dejvice -, and the Stalinist building of the Hotel International Prague.

Střešovice 
One of Prague's most expensive places in terms of rental prices. Many rich and ancient houses from the Functionalist period. Important sights: Villa Mueller or Baba - a completely protected area, full of Functionalist villas, which were built in 1937.

Ruzyně 

Famous for the Václav Havel Airport Prague as well as for its prison which also accommodated former President Václav Havel during the communist regime, together with other dissidents.

Government
The Civil Aviation Authority has its head office on the property of Václav Havel Airport in Ruzyně.

Economy
Czech Airlines has its head office on the grounds of Václav Havel Airport in Ruzyně. Travel Service Airlines and its low cost subsidiary Smart Wings have their head office on the airport property.

Education
Universities located in Prague 6:
 Czech Technical University (ČVUT)
 Institute of Chemical Technology (VŠCHT)
 Czech University of Agriculture (ČZU)
 Catholic Theological Faculty (KTF UK) and Faculty of Physical Education and Sport (FTVS UK) of Charles University

International schools:
 Prague British International School Vlastina Campus in Liboc; it formerly belonged to the pre-merger Prague British School.
 International School of Prague
 Japanese School of Prague (Řepy)
Riverside School, Prague

See also

Districts of Prague#Symbols
Statue of Ivan Konev in Prague

References

External links
 Prague 6 official website
 More information about Prague 6 and life there may be found in the correspondent article on the Prague Website Citypilot.cz

 
Districts of Prague